Emirhan İlkhan (born 1 June 2004) is a Turkish professional footballer who plays as a midfielder for Italian  club Sampdoria on loan from Torino.

Club career
A youth product of Beşiktaş, İlkhan began training with their senior team in 2021. He made his professional debut with Antalyaspor in a 1–1 (4–2) 2021 Turkish Super Cup penalty shootout win over Antalyaspor 5 January 2022, coming on as a late sub in the 80' minute.

On 10 August 2022, İlkhan signed with Torino in Italy. On 31 January 2023, he was loaned by Sampdoria.

International career
Emirhan is a youth international for Turkey, having represented the Turkey U16s and U18s.

Career statistics

Club

Honours
Beşiktaş
Turkish Super Cup: 2021

References

External links

 
Instagram Emirhan İlkhan

2004 births
Living people
Turkish footballers
Footballers from Istanbul
Association football midfielders
Turkey youth international footballers
Süper Lig players
Serie A players
Beşiktaş J.K. footballers
Torino F.C. players
U.C. Sampdoria players
Turkish expatriate footballers
Turkish expatriate sportspeople in Italy
Expatriate footballers in Italy